"Santa Claus Is Comin' to Town" is a Christmas song featuring Santa Claus written by J. Fred Coots and Haven Gillespie. The earliest known recorded version of the song was by banjoist Harry Reser and his band on October 24, 1934. It was then sung on Eddie Cantor's radio show in November 1934. This version became an instant hit with orders for 500,000 copies of sheet music and more than 30,000 records sold within 24 hours. The version for Bluebird Records by George Hall and His Orchestra (vocal by Sonny Schuyler) was very popular in 1934 and reached the various charts of the day. The song has been recorded by over 200 artists including Bing Crosby and the Andrews Sisters, the Crystals, Neil Diamond, Fred Astaire, Bruce Springsteen, Frank Sinatra, Bill Evans, Chris Isaak, the Temptations, the Carpenters, Michael Bublé, Luis Miguel, and the Jackson 5.

Melody and lyrics
Haven Gillespie's lyrics begin "You better watch out, better not cry / You better not pout, I'm telling you why / Santa Claus is coming to town".

Cantor's original performance, broadcast at the height of the Great Depression, included verses not in the standard version of the song, encouraging listeners to be charitable and help the less fortunate at Christmas.

History

Recordings
The earliest known recorded version of the song was by banjoist Harry Reser and his band on October 24, 1934 (Decca 264A) featuring Tom Stacks on vocal, the version shown in the Variety charts of December 1934. The song was a sheet music hit, reaching number 1. The song was also recorded for Victor Records (catalog No. 25145A) on September 26, 1935, by Tommy Dorsey & His Orchestra with vocals by Cliff Weston and Edythe Wright.

The song is a traditional Christmas standard and has been covered by numerous recording artists. Bing Crosby and the Andrews Sisters reached the Billboard charts briefly in 1947 with it.

1960s
In 1962, the Four Seasons version charted at number 23 on Billboard. In 1963, producer Phil Spector included a version of the song on his rock album A Christmas Gift for You from Phil Spector performed by the Crystals. In 1965, the Supremes' version charted at number 4 in Singapore.

1970s to 1990s
In 1970, Rankin-Bass produced Santa Claus Is Comin' to Town, an hour-long animated TV film based on the song, with Fred Astaire narrating the origin of Santa Claus. The same year, the Jackson 5 included the song on their best-selling album Jackson 5 Christmas Album. The Jackson 5 version would chart 50 years later on the Billboard 100 at #33. In 1971, the Partridge Family included the song on A Partridge Family Christmas Card. An eccentric 1972 live recording by Joseph Spence has been described as "a performance for the ages" by music critic Peter Margasak. The Carpenters released the song as a single in 1974.

A rock version by Bruce Springsteen & the E Street Band was recorded on December 12, 1975, at C. W. Post College in Brookville, New York, by Record Plant engineers Jimmy Iovine and Thom Panunzio. This version borrows the chorus refrain from the 1963 recording by the Crystals. It was released first in 1982 as part of the Sesame Street compilation album In Harmony 2, and again in 1985 as a B-side to "My Hometown", a single from the Born in the U.S.A. album. Springsteen's rendition of the song has received radio airplay perennially at Christmastime for years; it appeared on Billboard magazine's Hot Singles Recurrents chart each year from 2002 to 2009 due to seasonal air play. Live performances of the song often saw the band encouraging the audience to sing some of the lyrics with—or in place of—the band's vocalists (usually the line "you'd better be good for goodness sake", and occasionally the key line "Santa Claus is Comin' to Town" as well). Sometimes, concert crowds would sing along with the entire song, and the band, who were known to encourage this behavior for the song, would do nothing to dissuade those audiences from doing so, instead welcoming the crowds' enthusiasm. This version remains a Springsteen concert favorite during the months of November and December (often concluding the show), and the band is among the few that keep it in their roster of songs during the holidays.

Other well-known versions of this song include Mariah Carey from the album Merry Christmas (1994) and the Pointer Sisters version off the album A Very Special Christmas, also borrowing from the Crystal's arrangement. Andy Williams performed the song on his album I Still Believe in Santa Claus, which was released on October 1, 1990.

2000s to present
Luis Miguel recorded the song in Spanish as "Santa Claus Llegó a La Ciudad" for his Christmas album Navidades (2006). His version of the song peaked at number 26 on the Billboard Latin Pop Songs chart.

The song has also been recorded in a cappella versions. First by Straight No Chaser on their 2008 album Holiday Spirits, and later by Pentatonix on their 2014 album That's Christmas to Me.

In October 2015, EMI Music Publishing lost the rights to J. Fred Coot's stake in the song. EMI had earned the rights to the song via Leo Feist's publishing company in the 1980s.

In September 2017, the family of Haven Gillespie sued Memory Lane Music Group for $700,000, asking for an 85% stake in "Santa Claus Is Comin' to Town".

Sebastián Yatra recorded a Spanish version for Christmas 2019 and released it as a single. The song charted in Spain and on Billboard Hot Latin Songs chart and was certified gold by the RIAA in the US.

Charts

The Supremes version

The Jackson 5 version

Michael Bublé version

Glee Cast version

Mariah Carey version

Various artists version

Bruce Springsteen version

Luis Miguel Spanish version

Sebastián Yatra version

Frank Sinatra version

Certifications and sales

Frank Sinatra version

The Crystals version

The Jackson 5 version

Michael Bublé version

Bruce Springsteen version

Sebastián Yatra version

Mariah Carey version

See also
 List of Christmas carols

References

External links
  (original lyrics)

Songs about Santa Claus
1934 songs
Songs with lyrics by Haven Gillespie
Songs with music by John Frederick Coots
American Christmas songs
Bing Crosby songs
Bluebird Records singles
Bruce Springsteen songs
Eddie Cantor songs
Mariah Carey songs
Michael Bublé songs
The Andrews Sisters songs
The Carpenters songs
The Crystals songs
The Four Seasons (band) songs
The Jackson 5 songs
Song recordings produced by Phil Spector
Song recordings with Wall of Sound arrangements